Thayeria ifati is a freshwater fish in the family Characidae of the order Characiformes. It is a tropical fish. It resides in the basin of the Maroni and Approuague in French Guiana.

References

Fish described in 1959
Freshwater fish of South America
Taxa named by Jacques Géry
Characidae